The 1972 Espirito Santo Trophy took place 11–14 October at Hindu Country Club in Buenos Aires, Argentina. It was the fifth women's golf World Amateur Team Championship for the Espirito Santo Trophy. The tournament was a 72-hole stroke play team event with 20 three-woman teams. The best two scores for each round counted towards the team total.

The United States won the Trophy, defending their title from two years ago and winning their four consecutive title, beating France by four strokes. France took the silver medal while Sweden, seven strokes further behind, for the first time on the podium in the championship, took the bronze.

Teams 
20 teams contested the event. Each team had three players.

Results 

Sources:

Individual leaders 
There was no official recognition for the lowest individual scores.

References

External link 
World Amateur Team Championships on International Golf Federation website

Espirito Santo Trophy
Golf tournaments in Argentina
Espirito Santo Trophy
Espirito Santo Trophy
Espirito Santo Trophy